U. A. Khader (16 November 193512 December 2020) was an Indian author. He published in Malayalam, including novels, novellas, short stories, travelogues and non-fiction. His works have been translated to various languages including English, Hindi and Kannada. He was a recipient of the Sahitya Akademi Award in 2009 for his novella Thrikkottur Novellakal and had earlier received the Kerala Sahitya Akademi Award in 1984 for Thrikkottur Peruma.

Early life
Khader was born on 16 November 1935, in Bilin, Mon State, near Rangoon (now Yangon) in today's Myanmar. His father Ussangaantakathu Moithootti Haji had migrated to Burma from Quilandy, in the southern Indian state of Kerala. His mother, Mamaidi, was of Burmese origin. His mother died three days after his birth, from small pox. With the outbreak of the Second World War, a few years later, his family fled Burma and came to Kerala, when he was eight years old.

On return to India, he grew up as a Malayali at his father's native place in Quilandy. He completed his schooling from Koyilandy High School. Describing his early days, he talked about the dilemma of straddling two distinct cultures. He also talked of his classmates finding him strange because of his features. He would go on to obtain a degree in painting from the Madras College of Arts. During this period he got in touch with noted writers and social activists such as K. A. Kodungalloor and C. H. Mohammed Koya (who would later go on to become the chief minister of Kerala) during his days as a student in Madras (present day Chennai). His association with Koya would be a turning point, introducing him to books and writing, starting with a copy of Vaikom Muhammed Basheer's Balyakalasakhi.

Career 
Khader started his writing career by writing for magazines and journals. His first story was published in the Malayalam weekly, Chandrika, in 1953. The story was based on a real-life incident in which the author had to sell his watch to buy a dinner set as a wedding present for a friend. Khader had written quite harshly about his father and step-mother in the original draft which was later tempered when he handed over the story to C. H. Mohammed Koya, who had it tweaked before publishing it in Chandrika. Khader would take Koya's message and leave his own personal stories out of his works through his career, with the note that the story was not a space for the author's personal grief, but should instead talk to society.

He was the president of Purogamana Kala Sahitya Sangham, an organization of artists, writers and art and literature enthusiasts based in Kerala. Over his career, he wrote over 70 books spanning short stories, fiction and non-fiction novels, and travelogues. Some of his notable works included Thrikkottur Peruma, Aghorasivam, Arabikadalinte, Arippravinte Premam, Chempavizham, Katha Pole Jeevitham, Kalasam, Khuraisikkoottam, and Krishnamaniyile Theenaalam , Raziya Sultana, Shathru, Srishtavinte Khajana, and Theeram. His books were translated into many languages including English, Kannada, Tamil, and Hindi. In his travelogue Ormakalude Pegoda, which was serialised in Madhyamam Weekly in January 2012, he describes his nostalgic experiences when he visited his hometown Yangon after 70 years.

His works often focused on the Northern Malabar region of Kerala and the rural life here, with stories building on local myths, customs, and rituals, including the nagappattu and theyyam. He notably shunned modernism in his works while sticking to local stories. He would say about his choice of stories, "Modernism pushed away the readers at the base. Writers were writing of urban life and alienation that the common man could not relate to." His women characters were noted to have a "characteristic spunk" having independent views and having a mythical aura with celestial beings, Yakshinis, as physical manifestations of the metaphorical idea of beauty, making regular appearances. He draws on celestial characters like Unniyarcha to demonstrate bravery. His works also spoke about familial migrations with households being run by women, when the menfolk emigrating for work to places like Myanmar and Singapore.

Khader worked with the Kerala state government's health department administrative division between 1964 and 1990. During this time he was deputed to the Kozhikode Akashvani (Radio) division between 1967 and 1972. He had also worked briefly with the Institute of Maternal and Child Health within the Government Medical College in Kozhikode.

He was a recipient of the Sahitya Akademi Award in 2009 for his novella Thrikkottur Novellakal and had earlier received the Kerala Sahitya Akademi Award for Thrikkotur Peruma in 1983.

Death 
He died on 12 December 2020 at a private hospital in Calicut. He had been suffering from respiratory ailments and was also undergoing treatment for cancer. Earlier in 2019, the Kerala state government had decided to cover his treatment expenses.

Bibliography

Awards
 1984: Kerala Sahitya Akademi Award for Story – Thrikkottur Peruma
 1993: S. K. Pottekkattu Award – Katha Pole Jeevitham
 1993: Abu Dhabi Sakthi Award (Novel) – Oru Piti Vattu
 1999: C. H. Mohammed Koya Award – Kalimuttam
 2002: Kerala Sahitya Akademi Award for Novel – അഘോരശിവം
 2009: Kendra Sahitya Akademi Award – Thrikkottur Peruma
 2019: Mathrubhumi Literary Award – Contributions to Malayalam literature

References

1935 births
Indian Muslims
Malayali people
Malayalam-language writers
Indian people of Burmese descent
Malayalam novelists
Malayalam short story writers
People from Kozhikode district
People from Mon State
Burmese Muslims
Recipients of the Sahitya Akademi Award in Malayalam
Recipients of the Kerala Sahitya Akademi Award
2020 deaths
Novelists from Kerala
20th-century Indian short story writers
20th-century Indian novelists
Indian travel writers
Deaths from lung cancer in India
Recipients of the Abu Dhabi Sakthi Award